Bill Randolph (born October 11, 1953) is an American actor who has starred in films and appeared on television.

Early life
Randolph attended Lincoln High School where he acted in school plays. Afterwards, he attended Allan Hancock College and studied at its PCCA theater training program. Subsequently, he graduated from SUNY Purchase with a bachelor's degree in fine arts.

Career
He starred with Mercedes Hall (mother of Anthony Michael Hall) in Lanny Meyer and Arthur Morey's social protest disco musical St. Joan of the Microphone, which played in New York City parks and festivals, including the Lincoln Center Outdoor Festival, in the summer of 1977. He created the role of the club heart-throb, Supersonic Phil Harmonic.

On Broadway, he starred in the long-running play Gemini for two years.

Randolph's first feature film was the horror movie Dressed to Kill (1980), but he is best known for his role in the 1981 horror movie Friday the 13th Part 2 as Jeffrey. He also starred in the 1989 movie Penn & Teller Get Killed, and his most recent movie appearance was in the 1991 film Guilty as Charged.

He made guest appearances on TV shows such as Hill Street Blues and As the World Turns. Randolph starred in the short lived TV series Comedy Zone in 1984, and in the series Trauma Center.

Randolph retired from acting in the early 1990s to pursue a more steady career as a graphic designer and would work for the New York Daily News.

Filmography

References

External links
 

1953 births
American male musical theatre actors
American male film actors
American male stage actors
American male television actors
Living people
Male actors from Detroit